Deh-e Nur Mohammad Safarzayi (also Romanized as Deh-e Nūr Moḩammad Şafarzāyī) is a village in Dust Mohammad Rural District, in the Central District of Hirmand County, Sistan and Baluchestan Province, Iran. At the 2006 census, its population was 352, in 64 families.

References 

Populated places in Hirmand County